Engelberg is a municipality in Switzerland.

Engelberg may also refer to:

Places
 Engelberg Abbey in Engelberg, Switzerland
  in Grossheubach, Bavaria
 Engelberg (Leonberg), a mountain in Baden-Württemberg, Germany
 Engelberg (bei Engelbach), a mountain in Hesse, Germany
 Engelberg Tunnel, a motorway in Germany

Other uses
 Engelberg (surname)
 Engelberg (album), by Stephan Eicher
 Engelberg Huller Company

See also
 Engelsberg (disambiguation)

ro:Engelsberg (dezambiguizare)